Samuel Petráš (born 11 May 1995) is a Slovak professional ice hockey forward who currently playing for HK Poprad of the Slovak Extraliga.

Career 
Petráš was an academy player with Slovan Bratislava and made his senior debut for the team during the 2015–16 KHL season. He played 24 games in the KHL for the club and was also a member of ŠHK 37 Piešťany and HKM Zvolen. 

Petráš spent a season in the Supreme Hockey League for Sokol Krasnoyarsk before returning to HKM Zvolen on a permanent transfer on June 13, 2018. On July 24, 2020, Petráš rejoined Slovan Bratislava on a one-year contract.

Career statistics

Regular season and playoffs

International

References

External links

 

1995 births
Living people
Ice hockey people from Bratislava
Slovak ice hockey forwards
ŠHK 37 Piešťany players
HC Slovan Bratislava players
HKM Zvolen players
Sokol Krasnoyarsk players
MHk 32 Liptovský Mikuláš players
HK Poprad players
Slovak expatriate ice hockey players in Russia